Veer Ghatotkach is a 1949 Hindi Indian mythological film, starring 
Meena Kumari, Shahu Modak,  Sumiti Gupta, Vasant Pahelwan, Naranjan Sharma and S. N. Tripathi. Meena Kumari, after her career as a child artist, started doing adult roles as heroines in mythologicals and fantasy genres before she made it in mainstream cinema with Baiju Bawra (1952).

Storyline
While hiding from their vengeful cousins, the Kauravas, the Pandava brothers, Yudhister, Arjun, Bhim, Nakul, and Sahdev enter a forest, and this is where Bhim slays a demon. In order to make amends to the demon's mother, he agrees to marry her daughter, Hidamba, and they subsequently return home. Hidamba gets pregnant and gives birth to a baby boy who she names Ghatotkach, who grows up to be a mighty illusionist, who can fly, became a giant at will, and shape-shift. One day Ghatotkach gets into a confrontation, albeit unknowingly, with Abhimanyu, the son of Arjun, who is on his way to abduct Surekha, the daughter of Balram, who is being married against her will to Lakshman, the semi-senile son of Duryodhan, and ends up killing him. When he finds out that Abhimanyu is his cousin, he brings him back to life with Amrit (Holy Nectar), and decides to join him in his quest. The duo do get away with irritating the Kauravas, almost resulting in a battle between the Yadavs and them, but Krishna intercedes and placates both parties. With Krishna involved, will they succeed in abducting Surekha?

Soundtrack

References

1949 films
1940s Hindi-language films
Hindu mythological films
Films scored by S. N. Tripathi
Films based on the Mahabharata
Indian action drama films
1940s action drama films
Indian black-and-white films
1949 drama films